is a slice-of-life manga series written and illustrated by Shiro, which began serialization in Earth Star Entertainment's Comic Earth Star magazine in 2011. An anime television series by Eight Bit aired in Japan between January and March 2013 and was simulcasted by Crunchyroll. A second season aired from July to December 2014. An original video animation was released in October 2017, and a third season aired from July to September 2018. A new anime television series titled Encouragement of Climb: Next Summit aired from October to December 2022.

Plot
Aoi Yukimura is a quiet girl living in Hannō who prefers staying indoors and is afraid of heights. When she reunites with her childhood friend Hinata Kuraue, who is outgoing and loves mountaineering they decide to climb a mountain together, in order to see sunrise, which they saw together when they were younger. Along the way, they meet several other girls who are also interested in the outdoors, and begin a series of adventures on various mountains across Japan.

Characters

A high school girl who became afraid of heights after falling off a playground structure and breaking her leg. Thanks to Hinata's influence, she begins to take an interest in mountain climbing.

A hyperactive girl who loves mountains. She was friends with Aoi in elementary school before reuniting with her in high school. She encourages Aoi to conquer her fear of heights and take up mountain climbing.

A senior student in Aoi's high school who loves mountain climbing. She befriended Aoi when they met in an equipment store.

A middle school student Aoi and Hinata met and befriended on a mountain trail.

A young photographer who Aoi meets while climbing Mount Tanigawa. She is a middle school student who is one grade above Kokona, and goes to a local high school in Takasaki.

Kaede's classmate during both middle school and high school. She often worries about Kaede's safety whenever she goes climbing.

The president of the Mountaineering Club in Aoi's high school. Kaede and Yuuka's classmate.

Aoi's classmate, and sometimes talks to Aoi because she cares about her isolation.

One of Aoi's classmates.

Aoi's classmate and has been in the same class since middle school, but has never been able to talk to her.

Aoi's father.

Aoi's mother.

Hinata's father, an experienced mountain climber who took Aoi and Hinata to climb Mount Tanigawa when they were younger.

Hinata's mother.

Kokona's mother.

Honoka's older brother.

The manager of the cake shop "Susuki", where Aoi works part-time.

An energetic college student who works part time at a cake shop alongside Aoi.

Media

Manga
Yama no Susume began as a manga series written and illustrated by Shiro and published in Earth Star Entertainment's Comic Earth Star magazine. The first chapter appeared in the September 2011 issue of the magazine, released on August 12, 2011. The series' chapters have been compiled in 22 volumes, published between June 12, 2012, and September 12, 2022.

Anime

An anime television series, directed by Yusuke Yamamoto and produced by Eight Bit, aired in Japan on Tokyo MX between January 3 and March 21, 2013, and was simulcasted by Crunchyroll. The series consisted of twelve five-minute episodes, with an additional OVA episode bundled with the Blu-ray Disc release of the series on May 14, 2013.

A second season, consisting of 24 fifteen-minute episodes, began airing from July 9, 2014.

An original video animation, titled '', was released on January 26, 2018, following a screening in theaters and a limited release on October 28, 2017.

A third anime season premiered on July 2, 2018 and ran for 13 episodes, concluding on September 24, 2018.

On September 16, 2019, a new project was announced during an Autumn Festival in Japan. On March 18, 2021, it was announced that the project would be a new anime television series, titled . It consisted of 12 full-length episodes, and the main staff and cast members reprised their roles from previous seasons. The series aired from October 5 to December 21, 2022.

Notes

References

External links
Yama no Susume official manga website 
 Yama no Susume: First to Third Season official anime website 
 Yama no Susume: First Season official anime website 
 Yama no Susume: Second Season official anime story website 
 Yama no Susume: Omoide Present official anime story website 
 Yama no Susume: Third Season official anime story website 
 Yama no Susume: Next Summit Official anime website 

2013 anime television series debuts
2014 anime television series debuts
2018 anime television series debuts
2022 anime television series debuts
Anime series based on manga
Crunchyroll anime
Earth Star Entertainment manga
Eight Bit (studio)
Mountaineering in anime and manga
Shōnen manga
Slice of life anime and manga
Tokyo MX original programming